Bruce Lisker is a American man who at age 17 was wrongly arrested, tried, and convicted for the March 10, 1983 murder of his adoptive mother Dorka, 66, in the family's Sherman Oaks residence.

Lisker served 26 years, 5 months, and 3 days of a 16-years-to-life sentence in California prisons including the California Youth Authority (now the California Division of Juvenile Justice; 1986–87), San Quentin State Prison (1987-89), and Mule Creek State Prison (1989-2009). His conviction was overturned in a 2009 ruling by United States district court judge Virginia A. Phillips, in which she found that his 1985 murder conviction was obtained through the use of false evidence and ineffective assistance of counsel.
Lisker was freed on August 13, 2009.
On September 21, 2009, the Los Angeles County District Attorney (LADA) dropped all charges in the matter due to lack of evidence.

Compensation
On October 15, 2015, a settlement was reached in a lawsuit Lisker filed against the City of Los Angeles in which he accused police detectives of fabricating the evidence that put him behind bars. Lisker was awarded $7.6 million in compensation. Confidential memos from the City Attorney to the L.A. City Council, obtained by the Los Angeles Times, called Lisker's case "extremely dangerous" for the city should it have gone to trial, declaring that the potential results of such a trial could be "financially devastating" to the city.

Publicity
Lisker's case has been featured in numerous Los Angeles Times articles, the first of which earned its authors, investigative reporters Matt Lait and Scott Glover, the prestigious Heywood Broun award on behalf of the Times. The case was also featured in an hour-long episode of the CBS News television program 48 Hours Mysteries, entitled "The Whole Truth" (2010) hosted by correspondent Erin Moriarty, as well as the documentary film Survivors Guide to Prison (2018).

His time spent in the California Youth Authority is documented in an interview with Gladiator School, Stories from Inside YTS.

His case was dramatized in the CBS All Access series Interrogation.

References

Living people
1965 births
People from Van Nuys, Los Angeles
American people wrongfully convicted of murder